Curriñe is a village located at the confluence of Blanco River and Curriñe River, near northern shore of Maihue Lake, Futrono commune, southern Chile. 

Geography of Los Ríos Region
Populated places in Ranco Province